Gilead or Gilad (Gīləʿāḏ, Ǧalʻād, Jalaad) is the ancient, historic, biblical name of the mountainous northern part of the region of Transjordan. The region is bounded in the west by the Jordan River, in the north by the deep ravine of the river Yarmouk and the region of Bashan, and in the southwest by what were known during antiquity as the “plains of Moab”, with no definite boundary to the east. In some cases, “Gilead” is used in the Bible to refer to all the region east of the Jordan River. Gilead is situated in modern-day Jordan, corresponding roughly to the Irbid, Ajloun, Jerash and Balqa Governorates. 

Gilead is also the name of three people in the Hebrew Bible, and a common given name for males in modern-day Israel.

Etymology
If that is the case, Gilead means 'heap [of stones] of testimony'. There is also an alternative theory that it means 'rocky region'.

From its mountainous character, it is called the Mount of Gilead.

History

Hebrew Bible
The name Gilead first appears in the biblical account of the last meeting of Jacob and Laban. In Book of Genesis, Gilead was also referred to by the Aramaic name Yegar-Sahadutha, which carries the same meaning as the Hebrew Gilead, namely "heap [of stones] of testimony". 

According to the biblical narrative, during the Exodus, "half Gilead" was possessed by Sihon, and the other half, separated from it by the river Jabbok, by Og, king of Bashan. After the two kings were defeated, the region of Gilead was allotted by Moses to the tribes of Gad, Reuben, and the eastern half of Manasseh.

In the Book of Judges, the thirty sons of the biblical judge Jair controlled the thirty towns of Gilead, and in the First Book of Chronicles, Segub controlled twenty-three towns in Gilead. It was bounded on the north by Bashan, and on the south by Moab and Ammon.

"Gilead" mentioned in the Book of Hosea may refer to the cities of Ramoth-Gilead, Jabesh-Gilead, or the whole Gilead region; "Gilead is a city of those who work iniquity; it is stained with blood".

The kingdoms Ammon and Moab sometimes expanded to include southern Gilead. King David fled to Mahanaim in Gilead during the rebellion of Absalom. Gilead is later mentioned as the homeplace of the prophet Elijah.

Neo-Assyrian province
King Tiglath-Pileser III of Assyria established the province of Gal'azu (Gilead) c. 733 BCE.

Arabic
Gilead (Ǧalʻād or Jalaad) is an Arabic term used to refer to the mountainous land extending north and south of Jabbok. It was used more generally for the entire region east of the Jordan River. It corresponds today to the northwestern part of the Kingdom of Jordan.

People
Gilead may also refer to:
 A grandson of Manasseh and son of Machir (Makir), ancestor of the Iezerites and Helekites and of Segub ( and ). He also may have been the founder of the Israelite tribal group of Gilead, which is mentioned in biblical passages which textual scholars attribute to early sources. Textual scholars regard the genealogy in the Book of Numbers, which identifies Gilead as Machir's son, as originating in the priestly source, a document written centuries after the early JE source, in which the Gilead and Machir tribal groups are mentioned, and possibly having been written to rival the JE source. Biblical scholars view the biblical genealogies as postdiction, an eponymous metaphor providing an aetiology of the connectedness of the group to others in the Israelite confederation; the identification of Gilead as an aspect of Manasseh was the traditional explanation of why the tribal groups of Machir and Gilead are mentioned along with northern tribes in the ancient Song of Deborah, while Manasseh is absent from it. The text of the Book of Numbers appears to portray Gilead as the father of Asriel, but the Book of Chronicles states that Manasseh was the father of Asriel; it is possible for there to have been two different Asriels, though Manasseh is only indicated as having had one son – Machir – in the genealogy of the Book of Numbers.
 The son of Michael and father of Jaroah, in the Gadite genealogies;
 The father of Jephthah.

"eternal happiness".

See also
Balm of Gilead
Machir
Machir (tribal group)
Shibboleth
Tribe of Manasseh
Perea
Balqa
 Republic of Gilead

References

 
Ammon
Hebrew Bible regions
Regions of Jordan
Book of Numbers people
Moab
Tourism in Jordan
Founders of biblical tribes
Tribe of Reuben
Transjordan (region)